17 Monocerotis is a single star located around 490 light years away from the Sun in the equatorial constellation of Monoceros. It is visible to the naked eye as a faint, orange-hued star with an apparent visual magnitude of 4.77. The star is moving away from the Earth with a heliocentric radial velocity of +46 km/s.

This is an aging giant star with a stellar classification of K4 III. As a consequence of having exhausted the supply of hydrogen at its core, the star has expanded to 25 times the radius of the Sun. It is radiating around 538 times the Sun's luminosity from its swollen photosphere at an effective temperature of 4,345 K.

References

K-type giants
Monoceros (constellation)
BD+08 1496
Monocerotis, 17
049161
032533
2503